Beşikdüzü is a town and district of Trabzon Province in the Black Sea region of Turkey. The mayor is Ramis Uzun (CHP).

Name
The name Beşikdüzü is composed of two Turkish words, namely beşik, "a cradle" and düzü, "a plain". There is a mountain may be strato volcano called Beşikdağ 1 km. south of city and there is a plain area north of this mountain next to the Black Sea coast. And the city is situated on this are so the name given to it for this reason.
One of the 20 village institutes was established in Beşikdüzü.

Current situation
The city centre is a new built city with a history of about 100 years. It was a local market for the surrounding villages and developed as a city by education government and trade facilities. Now it is the third most populated district of Trabzon province. The district of Beşikdüzü has 25 villages with population of 18,000 and the city centre has a population of 29,000 people.

Geography
The district is a mountainous area as well as the rest of the Trabzon province. But there are suitable plain areas at the seaside for building new parts of the city development. The city is on the Black Sea coast and there is a harbour 2 km west. The area of the district is 121 km².

Rivers
Agasar river is the longest river of the district. It passes across the city centre. There are three big bridges on it. Kurbağalıdere river is the eastern border with Vakfıkebir district, Değirmendere river comes from the forest region and the situated at the western part of district.

Climate and vegetation
The district has subtropical climate. All the year rainy and cloudy weather prevails. The winters are not cold and the summers are warm. The hottest temperature 22 °C and the coldest is 6 °C. Humidity is around %65-70. Because of this rainy and humid weather all the area is covered by forests and hazelnut trees. One can never see an empty area except for the houses and the roads.

Agriculture
Arable area is 6,195 hectares in the district, the forests comprise 1,141 hectares, meadows 750 hectares and 23 hectares unproductive area.

hazelnut 3640 ha
tea plantations 146 ha
corn 750 ha
potato 305 ha
oranges 37 ha
kiwi 4 ha  
bean 100 ha
food plantations 400 ha 
other vegetables 100 ha

Settlements
 The neighborhoods of the district are Beşikdüzü, Türkeli (Oğuz) and Yeşilköy (Abdallı).
 The quarters of Beşikdüzü town are Cumhuriyet Mahallesi, Fatih Mahallesi, Beşikdağ Mahallesi, Nefsişarlı Mahallesi, Adacık Mahallesi, Vardallı Mahallesi and Çeşmeönü Mahallesi (Yobol).
 The villages of the district are as follows:

Ağaçlı (Kancuma), Akkese, Aksaklı, Anbarlı, Ardıçatak, Bayırköy, Bozlu, Çakırlı, Çıtlaklı, Dağlıca (Mesopliya), Denizli (Lugana), Dolanlı, Duygulu, Gürgenli (Kadahor), Hünerli (Kefli), Kalegüney, Korkuthan, Kutluca (Huplu), Resullü, Sayvancık (İstil), Seyitahmet, Şahmelik, Takazlı, Yenicami and Zemberek.

References

External links

District municipality's official website 
Beşikdüzü VR Photography 

Populated places in Trabzon Province
Black Sea port cities and towns in Turkey
Fishing communities in Turkey
Populated coastal places in Turkey
Districts of Trabzon Province
Towns in Turkey